EQP, an abbreviation for equational prover, is an automated theorem proving program for equational logic, developed by the Mathematics and Computer Science Division of the Argonne National Laboratory.  It was one of the provers used for solving a longstanding problem posed by Herbert Robbins, namely, whether all Robbins algebras are Boolean algebras.

External links

 EQP project.
 Robbins Algebras Are Boolean.
 Argonne National Laboratory, Mathematics and Computer Science Division.

Theorem proving software systems